The following is a list of events, births, and deaths in 1854 in Switzerland.

Incumbents 
Federal Council:
Ulrich Ochsenbein then Jakob Stämpfli
Jonas Furrer 
Josef Munzinger 
Henri Druey 
Friedrich Frey-Herosé (President)
Wilhelm Matthias Naeff 
Stefano Franscini

Events 
 August 27 - Alfred Wills ascends the Wetterhorn, starting the golden age of alpinism
 December 19 - The Basel SBB railway station is opened
 The West Switzerland Company is formed
 The United Bank of Switzerland is formed in the form of the Swiss Bank Corporation when six private banking firms pool their resources
 Roads and canals taken in hand were taken under federal control

Art and literature 
 The fables of Jean Jacques Porchat are reissued under the new title Fables et paraboles

Births 
 March 30 - Alfred Ilg, engineer (d. 1916)
 April 19 - Emma Pieczynska-Reichenbach, abolitionist and feminist (d. 1927)
 August 2 - Eugène Ruffy, politician (d. 1919)
 August 30 - Edmond Louis Budry, hymn writer (d. 1932)
 September 15 - Traugott Sandmeyer, chemist (d. 1922)
 September 23 - Charles Soret, physicist and chemist (d. 1904)
 September 24 - Robert Keller, botanist (d. 1939)

Deaths 
 May 12 - Melchior Berri, architect (b. 1801)
 October 22 - Jeremias Gotthelf, novelist (b. 1797)
 November 18 - Alberich Zwyssig, composer of the Swiss Psalm (b. 1808)
 John James Chalon, painter (b. 1778)

References 

 
Years of the 19th century in Switzerland